Aurélio Fernández Miguel (born March 10, 1964) is a Brazilian judoka and Olympic champion, and later politician. Among his best sporting achievements are his gold medal at the 1988 Summer Olympics in Seoul, and a bronze medal at the 1996 Summer Olympics in Atlanta.

Sports career
Aurélio Miguel was born on March 10, 1964, in São Paulo. Due to asthma and the insistence of his father, Aurélio Marin, Aurélio Fernández Miguel began training in judo at the age of four years. Initially, Aurélio disliked judo, and as a child, was terrified of the roughness of the competitions and tournaments. As time passed, he became fond of the sport, and eventually won his first title in 1972. Aurélio Miguel then won the Paulista tournament many times, and by the year 1980, he was recognized as the best judoka in the state. Afterwards, Miguel started to compete internationally, winning the silver medal at the 1983 Pan American Games in Caracas, Venezuela. He won the gold medal in the 1987 Pan American Games, again fighting in the under 95 kg category. In 1987 he also won a bronze medal at the World Judo Championships. At the 1988 Summer Olympics in Seoul he became Olympic Champion, winning the -95 kg class by beating Marc Meiling from West Germany in the final. At the 1992 Summer Olympics in Barcelona he placed ninth. He won a silver medal at the 1993 World Judo Championships in Hamilton, losing the final to Hungarian judoka Antal Kovács. At the 1996 Summer Olympics in Atlanta he received a bronze medal, and next year he won a silver medal at the 1997 World Judo Championships in Paris, behind gold winner Pawel Nastula from Poland.

Political career
Aurélio successfully ran for the city council of São Paulo in October 2004, representing the Partido Liberal party, being reelected for a second term in 2008 under the banner of the Republic Party.

References

External links
Official website
Aurélio Miguel at the Câmara de Vereadores de São Paulo website

1964 births
Living people
Brazilian male judoka
Olympic judoka of Brazil
Judoka at the 1988 Summer Olympics
Judoka at the 1992 Summer Olympics
Judoka at the 1996 Summer Olympics
Olympic gold medalists for Brazil
Olympic bronze medalists for Brazil
Brazilian people of Catalan descent
Brazilian sportsperson-politicians
Liberal Party (Brazil, 1985) politicians
Liberal Party (Brazil, 2006) politicians
Sportspeople from São Paulo
Olympic medalists in judo
Medalists at the 1996 Summer Olympics
Medalists at the 1988 Summer Olympics
Pan American Games medalists in judo
Pan American Games gold medalists for Brazil
Pan American Games silver medalists for Brazil
Universiade medalists in judo
Judoka at the 1983 Pan American Games
Judoka at the 1987 Pan American Games
Universiade silver medalists for Brazil
Universiade bronze medalists for Brazil
Medalists at the 1985 Summer Universiade